Jim or James Brogan may refer to:

Jim Brogan (basketball) (born 1958), American basketball player, played for the San Diego Clippers in the early 1980s
Jim Brogan (Scottish footballer) (1944–2018), Scottish footballer, played for Celtic F.C. in the late 1960s and early 1970s
Jim Brogan (Gaelic footballer), Irish Gaelic footballer, played for Dublin GAA in the 1970s
Jimmy Brogan (born 1948), American comedian, writer, actor
James Brogan (footballer, born 1865) (1865–?), Scottish footballer, played for Hibernian, Heart of Midlothian and Bolton Wanderers in the 1880s and 1890s
James Brogan (footballer, born 1890) (1890–?), Scottish footballer, played for Bristol Rovers in the 1910s
James Brogan (Medal of Honor) (1834–1908), U.S. Army soldier